East Cameron Township is a township in Northumberland County, Pennsylvania, United States. The population at the 2010 Census was 748, an increase over the figure of 686 tabulated in 2000.

Geography

Demographics

As of the census of 2000, there were 686 people, 267 households, and 210 families residing in the township. The population density was 57.8 people per square mile (22.3/km2). There were 301 housing units at an average density of 25.4/sq mi (9.8/km2). The racial makeup of the township was 99.56% White, 0.29% Native American and 0.15% Asian. Hispanic or Latino of any race were 1.31% of the population.

There were 267 households, out of which 29.2% had children under the age of 18 living with them, 69.7% were married couples living together, 6.0% had a female householder with no husband present, and 21.0% were non-families. 18.7% of all households were made up of individuals, and 9.0% had someone living alone who was 65 years of age or older. The average household size was 2.57 and the average family size was 2.91.

In the township the population was spread out, with 22.2% under the age of 18, 5.2% from 18 to 24, 29.6% from 25 to 44, 28.9% from 45 to 64, and 14.1% who were 65 years of age or older. The median age was 41 years. For every 100 females, there were 100.0 males. For every 100 females age 18 and over, there were 96.3 males.

The median income for a household in the township was $32,500, and the median income for a family was $38,594. Males had a median income of $30,481 versus $17,500 for females. The per capita income for the township was $15,345. About 11.0% of families and 11.8% of the population were below the poverty line, including 14.9% of those under age 18 and 6.0% of those age 65 or over.

References

Townships in Northumberland County, Pennsylvania
Townships in Pennsylvania